Bakhtawar Khan Mohammad, or simply Bakhtawar, (Persian: بختورخان ، محمد, born 1620 in Persia; died February 19, 1685, near Delhi) was a Persian historian, poet, official and later also personal advisor of the king at the court of the Mughal emperor Aurangzeb.

Early life 
Like many Persian poets, traders and nobles in the Early modern period, Bakhtawar's family migrated from Persia to the Mughal Empire, where Persian-speaking people in particular were in great demand at the court and made up an important part of the nobility.

See also
 Persians in the Mughal Empire

Literature 

 S. S. Alvi, “The Historians of Awrangzeb: A Comparative Study of Three Primary Sources,” Essays on Islamic Civilization, ed. D. P. Little, Leiden, 1976, pp. 57–73.
 Bakhtāwar Khān, Mirʾāt al-ʿĀlam: History of Emperor Awrangzeb ʿĀlamgīr, ed. S. S. Alvi, I-II, Lahore, 1979.
 H. M. Elliot, The History of India as Told by Its Own Historians, ed. J. Dowson, London, 1877, VIII, pp. 150–53.
 Mostaʿed Khan, Maʾāṯer-e ʿālamgīrī, Eng. tr. Jadunath Sarkar, Calcutta, 1947, pp. 59, 61, 142, 155.
 Moḥammad-Afżal Sarḵoš, Kalemāt al-šoʿarāʾ, Lahore, n.d., pp. 25–26. EI2 I, p. 954.
 Rieu, Pers. Man. I, pp. 124–27; III, pp. 890–91, 975.
 Storey, I, pp. 132–33, 517, 1012.

References 

1620 births
1685 deaths
17th-century Iranian historians
17th-century Persian-language poets